Alice Mary Stoll (1917 - 2014) was an American biophysicist who developed fire-resistant fabric. She was a pioneer in aerospace medicine. She received the Achievement Award from the Society of Women Engineers in 1969.

Early life 
Stoll was born in Long Island. She completed her bachelor's degree in chemistry and physics at Hunter College in 1938. She earned a Masters in physiology and biophysics at Cornell University in 1948. Whilst completing her postgraduate studies, Stoll worked as a research assistant at New York Medical College, studying metabolism and allergies using infrared spectroscopy. Whilst a research assistant, Stoll invented a liquid cell for the Infrared spectrophotometer.

Research and career 
After graduating Cornell University Stoll worked in the United States Navy Reserves and served as an active duty officer. She worked simultaneously as a consultant for the Arctic Aeromedical Laboratory. Stoll studied the impact of ultraviolet radiation on Entamoeba histolytica cysts. She joined Cornell University again in 1946, working on temperature regulation and environmental thermal radiation. In 1953 she joined the Naval Air Development Center (NADC), where she was a special technical assistant in the thermal laboratory. Stoll did research into the high g-forces felt by humans in space and during air combat, developing the G-time tolerance curve ("Stoll curve") which is used to protect pilots from G-LOC. and published in 1956.
 
She demonstrated that grayout, blackout and unconsciousness were affected by the rate of onset, and acceleration level of aviation pilots. These results are sometimes expressed as a 'Stoll curve' Stoll was the first woman to be subjected to extreme gravitational force, riding the NADC centrifuge to grayout at 7.5Gs.

She also worked on the effects of heat and burns, to show the relationship between incident radiant energy density and exposure time. Stoll's thermal model was verified by blackening the volar surfaces of the forearms to thermal radiation and exposure to sources of heat, and recording levels of sensation and temperature rise, and further experiments on anesthetized rats and pigs. Confusingly, the near reciprocal relationship between maximum safe energy and exposure time, is also sometimes referred to as a 'Stoll curve'.

She led the thermal laboratory between 1960 and 1964. Whilst at NADC Stoll developed equipment to analyse heat transfer during contact with flames and monitor thermal tissue damage. Stoll's guidelines on thermal safety resulted in the development of Nomex, a polymer based fibre with outstanding thermal properties. Nomex was developed by DuPont in the 1960s and first came to market in 1967.

In 1964 she became the lead for the biophysical and bioastronautical division. In 1965 she was awarded a Federal Civil Service Award. She was made a Fellow of the American Society of Mechanical Engineers and Chair of the Technical Committee K-17 of the Heat Transfer Division in 1965. She retired from the Naval Reserve as a commander in 1966.  The military recognised the importance of Stoll's research, writing a letter of commendation in the military publication the Navy Officer’s Jacket. She was awarded the Achievement Award of the Society of Women Engineers in 1969 and the Aerospace Medical Association Paul Bert Award in 1972. She was made the lead of the biophysical laboratory in 1970 and worked there until she retired in 1980. In 1980 she was named Honorary Member of the Wing. She was a Fellow of the American Association for the Advancement of Science.

Death and legacy 
Stoll died in March 2014. The Maria A. Chianta and Alice M. Stoll Professor of Physics Chair at Hunter College is in her honour.

References 

1917 births
2014 deaths
American biophysicists
Cornell University alumni
Cornell University faculty
Hunter College alumni